Robert Maxwell (1696-1766) was a Scottish writer on agriculture.

He was born in Kirkcudbrightshire. He was an active member of the Society of Improvers in the Knowledge of Agriculture in Scotland.

He published books including The Practical Husbandman, being a Collection of Miscellaneous Papers on Husbandry (1757) and The Practical Beemaster (1747).

Further reading
 Science and Agricultural Progress: Quantitative Evidence from England, 1660-1780 by Joshua Lerner, Agricultural History, Vol. 66, No. 4 (Autumn, 1992), pp. 11–27

References

1696 births
1766 deaths
18th-century Scottish writers
Agricultural writers